Buikwe, sometimes spelled Buyikwe, is a town in Buikwe District, Uganda. It is the administrative center of the district and the location of the district headquarters.

Location
The coordinates of Buikwe Town Council are 0°20'36.0"N, 33°01'44.0"E (Latitude:0.343333; Longitude:33.028889).

Overview
Buikwe is a small town in the south-east of the Central Region. It is the homebase of the Nalubaale Football Club.

Population
On 27 August 2014, the national population census put Buikwe's population at 16,633. In 2015, the Uganda Bureau of Statistics (UBOS), estimated the population of Buikwe at 16,800 people. In 2020, he population agency estimated the mid-year population of the town at 18,500, of whom 9,700 (52.4 percent) were female and 8,800 (47.6 percent) were male. UBOS calculated the annual rate of population growth of the town to average 1.95 percent annually, between 2015 and 2020.

Points of interest
The following points of interest are found in or near Buikwe Town Council.

The offices of Buikwe District Administration, the offices of Buikwe Town Council and Buikwe Central Market. Also found here is St. Charles Lwanga Buikwe Hospital, an 80-bed community hospital founded by missionaries from the Czech Republic. 

The town also hosts a number of places of worship; including Buikwe Full Gospel Church, affiliated with the Pentecostal Movement, Buikwe Church of Uganda, Buikwe Seventh Day Adventist Church and Buikwe Roman Catholic Church.

See also
 Lugazi
 Ngogwe
 Njeru
 Nkokonjeru
 List of cities and towns in Uganda

References

External links
 Buikwe District Homepage
  Website of Buikwe Full Gospel Church
  Czech - Slovak - Ugandan hospital 
 A letter From the Member of Parliament For Buikwe West Constituency

Populated places in Central Region, Uganda
Cities in the Great Rift Valley
Buikwe District